James Harding Southard (January 20, 1851 – February 20, 1919) was an American lawyer and politician who served six terms as a U.S. Representative from Ohio from 1895 to 1907.

Biography 
Born near Toledo, Ohio, in Washington Township, Lucas County, Ohio, Southard attended the public schools and was graduated from Cornell University, Ithaca, New York, in 1874.
He studied law.
He was admitted to the bar in 1877 and commenced practice in Toledo, Ohio.
He was appointed assistant prosecuting attorney of Lucas County in 1882.
Twice elected prosecuting attorney of the county, he served in that office six years.

Congress 
Southard was elected as a Republican to the Fifty-fourth and to the five succeeding Congresses (March 4, 1895 – March 3, 1907).

He served as chairman of the Committee on Coinage, Weights, and Measures (Fifty-sixth through Fifty-ninth Congresses). During his time in Congress, Southard passed legislation establishing the National Bureau of Standards, and introduced a bill (though it never passed) requiring the U.S. to adopt the metric system.

He was an unsuccessful candidate for reelection in 1906 to the Sixtieth Congress.

Private life
He resumed the practice of law in Toledo, Ohio, until his death there February 20, 1919.
He was interred in Woodlawn Cemetery.

Southard married Carrie T. Wales of Toledo in 1883. They had three children. He was a Freemason, a member of the Knights of Pythias, and an Elk.

References

External links 
 

1851 births
1919 deaths
Cornell University alumni
Politicians from Toledo, Ohio
Ohio lawyers
County district attorneys in Ohio
19th-century American politicians
Lawyers from Toledo, Ohio
19th-century American lawyers
Republican Party members of the United States House of Representatives from Ohio